Alroy may refer to:

 David Alroy ( 1160), a Jewish pseudo-Messiah born at Amadia in Iraq
 John Alroy (born 1966), American paleobiologist
 Alroy Jovi (born 1987), Indian animator
 Alroy (Disraeli novel), a 1833 novel by Benjamin Disraeli

See also